The Polytechnic University of Tirana (UPT) is a public university located in Tirana, the capital of Albania. It offers degrees in engineering and related fields.

History 
The Polytechnic University of Tirana is the oldest and the second largest university in Albania, after the University of Tirana. It was founded in 1951 and now has approximately 10,000 students, who come from Albania, Kosovo, Montenegro, and North Macedonia. In 2012, at the occasion of the 100th Anniversary of the Independence of Albania, UPT was awarded a high honour badge by the President of Albania, Bujar Nishani.  The university is fully accredited by the Albanian Public Agency for Accreditation of Higher Education (APAAHE).

Academics
The university includes six colleges and two research institutes:

Faculty of Civil Engineering
Faculty of Information Technology
Faculty of Mechanical Engineering
Faculty of Geology and Mining 
Faculty of Electrical Engineering
Faculty of Mathematics and Physics
Faculty of Architecture and Urbanism
Geosciences Institute
Institute of Energy, Water and Environment

PUT emphasises teaching over research. It issues three-year Bachelor degrees, two-year Master degrees, and three- to five-year doctoral degrees. The academic programs are compatible with the Bologna system. The language of instruction is Albanian and, for special and/or exchange courses, English.

Among the PUT departments, the Department of Architecture and Urban Planning (DAUP), included within the Faculty of Civil Engineering is particularly competitive. It accepts about 120 students each year, out of a candidate pool sometimes as large as 360. DAUP is the largest department of architecture and urban planning in Albania and employs 35 full-time tenure-track professors, 40 adjunct professors, and 16 guest professors. It offers integrated five-year programs (Bachelor + Master) in architecture and urban planning. In the architecture program, the education of students in structural engineering and building technology are major focuses of the curriculum. In the urban planning program, urban design and landscape architecture are in focus. In addition to the integrated diplomas, DAUP offers a 3-5 year Ph.D./Doctorate program, which includes three profiles (1) Architecture Design (2) Urban Planning and (3) Historic Preservation and Restoration.

See also
List of universities in Albania
Quality Assurance Agency of Higher Education
INIMA

References

Polytechnic University of Tirana
Educational institutions established in 1951
Universities and colleges in Tirana
1951 establishments in Albania